The 1986 Star World Championships were held on Capri, Italy in 1986.

Results

References

Star World Championships
1986 in sailing
Sailing competitions in Italy